Maravilla Tenejapa is a town and one of the 119 Municipalities of Chiapas, in southern Mexico.

As of 2010, the municipality had a total population of 11,451, up from 10,526 as of 2005. It covers an area of 411.32 km².

As of 2010, the town of Maravilla Tenejapa had a population of 1,477. Other than the town of Maravilla Tenejapa, the municipality had 51 localities, the largest of which (with 2010 populations in parentheses) was: Santo Domingo de las Palmas (1,248), classified as rural.

References

Municipalities of Chiapas